

473001–473100 

|-bgcolor=#f2f2f2
| colspan=4 align=center | 
|}

473101–473200 

|-bgcolor=#f2f2f2
| colspan=4 align=center | 
|}

473201–473300 

|-bgcolor=#f2f2f2
| colspan=4 align=center | 
|}

473301–473400 

|-bgcolor=#f2f2f2
| colspan=4 align=center | 
|}

473401–473500 

|-bgcolor=#f2f2f2
| colspan=4 align=center | 
|}

473501–473600 

|-id=503
| 473503 Minoruozima ||  || Minoru Ozima (born 1930) was among the first geochemists to recognize that information contained in noble gas isotopes sheds light on the process of formation and evolution of the planets. He is a leading figure in this field, having greatly contributed to the development of the geochemistry and cosmochemistry of noble gases (also see V. M. Goldschmidt Award). || 
|}

473601–473700 

|-bgcolor=#f2f2f2
| colspan=4 align=center | 
|}

473701–473800 

|-bgcolor=#f2f2f2
| colspan=4 align=center | 
|}

473801–473900 

|-bgcolor=#f2f2f2
| colspan=4 align=center | 
|}

473901–474000 

|-bgcolor=#f2f2f2
| colspan=4 align=center | 
|}

References 

473001-474000